Mount Wood is a 12,657-foot-elevation (3,858 meter) mountain summit located just east of the crest of the Sierra Nevada mountain range, in Mono County of northern California, United States. It is situated in the Ansel Adams Wilderness, on land managed by Inyo National Forest. The mountain is visible from the June Lake Loop.

History
This geographical feature was named in 1894 by Lieutenant Nathaniel Fish McClure who prepared a map of Yosemite Park for use by Army troops. The toponym honors Captain Abram Epperson Wood, 4th Cavalry US Army, the first acting military superintendent of Yosemite National Park from 1891 to 1893, shortly before he died in 1894. The US Army had jurisdiction over Yosemite National Park from 1891 to 1914, and each summer 150 cavalrymen traveled from the Presidio of San Francisco to patrol the park. This landform's toponym has been officially adopted by the U.S. Board on Geographic Names.

Climate
According to the Köppen climate classification system, Mount Wood is located in an alpine climate zone. Most weather fronts originate in the Pacific Ocean, and travel east toward the Sierra Nevada mountains. As fronts approach, they are forced upward by the peaks (orographic lift), causing them to drop their moisture in the form of rain or snowfall onto the range. Precipitation runoff from this mountain drains into Parker and Alger Creeks, both of which are tributaries of Rush Creek.

Gallery

See also
 
 Geology of the Yosemite area
 Gale Peak
 Mount Lewis (California)

References

Mountains of Mono County, California
Mountains of the Ansel Adams Wilderness
North American 3000 m summits
Mountains of Northern California
Sierra Nevada (United States)
Inyo National Forest
Mountains of the Sierra Nevada (United States)